The 2010 NCAA Rifle Championships were contested at the 31st annual NCAA-sanctioned competition to determine the team and individual national champions of co-ed collegiate rifle shooting in the United States. 

The championships were again held at the TCU Rifle Range at Texas Christian University in Fort Worth, Texas.

Hosts TCU won the team championship, the Horned Frogs' first NCAA national title in rifle.

Qualification
With only one national collegiate championship for rifle shooting, all NCAA rifle programs (whether from Division I, Division II, or Division III) were eligible. A total of eight teams contested this championship.

Results
Scoring:  The championship consisted of 60 shots for both smallbore and air rifle per team.

Team title
(DC) = Defending champions
Italics = Inaugural championship

Individual events

References

NCAA Rifle Championship
NCAA Rifle Championships
2010 in shooting sports
NCAA Rifle Championships